The College of Engineering (COE), and its School of Engineering Technology, is one of the eight colleges housed by the Mindanao State University – Iligan Institute of Technology (MSU-IIT) located in Iligan City in the Philippines.  This college is headed by the School Director, Santiago R. Evasco Jr., a professor at the IACET Department.  Established in 1977, this college offers engineering technology courses in automotive engineering, chemical engineering, civil engineering, electrical engineering, industrial automation and control, materials science, mechanical engineering, and heating-ventilating-airconditioning-refrigeration.

References

External links

COE's web page at MSU-IIT's website

Mindanao State University
Educational institutions established in 1977
1977 establishments in the Philippines